Let It Burn may refer to:

Albums 
 Let It Burn (Datsik album), 2013
 Let It Burn, a 2004 EP by The Vasco Era
 Let It Burn (Nebula album), 1998

Songs 
 "Let It Burn" (song), by Jazmine Sullivan, 2015
 "Let It Burn", by Bad Religion from The New America
 "Let It Burn", by Blaze Ya Dead Homie
 "Let It Burn", by Ignite from Our Darkest Days
 "Let It Burn", by Red from Until We Have Faces
 "Let It Burn", by Ryan Adams from Prisoner (B-Sides)
 "Let It Burn", by stic.man from The Workout
 "Let It Burn", by Volbeat from Seal the Deal & Let's Boogie